"The One with the Fake Monica" is the twenty-first episode of Friends first season. It first aired on the NBC network in the United States on April 27, 1995.

Plot
Monica finds out that someone has stolen her credit card and has been using it. When she receives the credit card statement she realises that the thief is doing all the things in life that she wishes she could do, for example, take tap dancing lessons. She, Rachel and Phoebe decide to find the thief at the tap dance class and end up becoming her friends. In order to prevent suspicion, real Monica introduces herself as "Monana". The four become good friends and Monica lives her life as recklessly as she wished she did. However, Fake Monica eventually gets caught and the real Monica visits her in jail and tells her that it was her credit card that was stolen. Monica admits that she did not turn her in and thanks her for inspiring her. She also decides to use this experience as a lesson to not just wish she did things, but actually do them.

Ross's capuchin monkey, Marcel, reaches sexual maturity and will not stop trying to mate with objects and his leg. Ross decides that he can no longer take care of Marcel and so he looks for a zoo for him. After some frustrating attempts including an offer where Marcel would be pitted against other animals in combat, Marcel is eventually accepted into the San Diego Zoo and Ross, Chandler, Joey, Rachel and Phoebe say goodbye to him at the airport.

Joey's agent, Estelle, suggests that he create a stage name because "Joey Tribbiani" is too ethnic. Chandler tricks him into using the name "Joseph Stalin", only for him to be rejected at the audition upon finding out and being appalled about the dictator's actions. Later, at the audition, Joey uses the name "Holden McGroin", presumably having been tricked again.

Production
In one scene, Phoebe, sitting on the couch, can be seen playing Game Boy. Unusually though, she looks into the camera while doing so.

When Joey asks what his stage name should be, Phoebe replies with Flame Boy, presumably as she is playing Game Boy.

Reception
Entertainment Weekly gave the episode a C, describing the episode as "thin and hokey" with a "semi-sappy "carpe diem" theme that doesn't jibe with the series' tone of slackeresque cynicism". They also said the monkey-humping joke gets annoying after a while.

The A.V. Club were more positive about the episode, and called the tap dance scene a "total gem".

Telegraph & Argus ranked it #142 on their ranking of the 236 Friends episodes.

References

1995 American television episodes
Friends (season 1) episodes